The Rowan Brothers is the eponymous debut studio album by the country rock duo The Rowan Brothers.

Track listing
 "Hickory Day"
 "All Together"
 "Best You Can"
 "One More Time"
 "Lay Me Down"
 "Wizard"
 "Mama Don't You Cry"
 "Gold"
 "Love Will Conquer"
 "Lady of Laughter"
 "Move on Down"
 "Singin' Song"

Personnel
Chris Rowan - guitar, vocals
Lorin Rowan - guitar, vocals
 Beverly Bellows - harp
 Iasos Bernadot - flute
 Ed Bogas - strings
 Jack Bonus - flute, saxophone
 Bill Elliott - keyboards
 Buddy Emmons - steel guitar
 Richard Fenner - violoncello
 Jerry Garcia - guitar
 Jim Keltner - drums
 Bill Kreutzmann - drums
 Peter Rowan - guitar, mandolin, vocals

References

The Rowans albums
1972 debut albums
Albums produced by Richard Podolor
Asylum Records albums